Pitogo may refer to one of several topics relating to the Philippines:
Cycas edentata, a species of Cycas called "pitogo" in the Philippines
Pitogo, Quezon
Pitogo, Zamboanga del Sur
Pitogo, Makati
President Carlos P. Garcia, Bohol, formerly known as Pitogo